The 1st Security Group is a military formation of the Republic of Korea Army. The group is subordinated to the Capital Defense Command. It headquartered in Seodaemun District, Seoul, and have the mission to guards Mt. Bukak, Mt. Inwang, the central part of downtown Seoul, and the Blue House.

History 
According to the plan by President Kim Young-sam to liquidate the remnants of the military dictatorship, on 17 December 1996, the 30th and 33rd Security Group were incorporated, and the 1st Security Group was established.

Organization 
Headquarters (Seodaemun District)
Signal Troop
Transport Troop
Armored Company (K808 APC)
Chemical unit
Combat Support Company
Equipped with 81mm mortars and 106mm recoilless guns mounted on light truck
30th Security Battalion
33rd Security Battalion

References 

Republic of Korea Army
Military units and formations established in 1996
Seoul